Esteban Fernandino (1908-1976) was an Argentine racecar driver. A native of Coronel Pringles, he was also known as Esteban Fernandino senior or Esteban Fernandino I, as his son Esteban "Chango" Fernandino also became a well-known driver. Among his greatest successes were his victories in the Mil Millas Argentinas race of 1940 and the Gran Premio del Sur of 1942. Both victories landed him on the coveted cover of El Grafico magazine.

Racing record
 1938: 3° Rio Negro-Neuquen-Chubut.
 1939: 6º Gran Premio Argentino.
 1940: 1° Mil Millas Argentinas
 1941: 3° Mil Millas Argentinas
 1942: 1° Gran Premio Argentino al Sur
 1947: 2° Doble Vta de la Ventana, 13º Gran Premio Internacional.
 1950: 4° Rio Diamante Mza.
 1951: 6º Vta.del Norte.
 1952: 2° C.Rivadavia, 14ª C.Pringles.

References

Argentine racing drivers
1908 births
1976 deaths